Malati J. Shendge (1934–2015) was an Indologist. She received her Ph.D in Buddhism from the University of Delhi.  She had been a fellow of the Indian Council of Historical Research, and of the Indian Institute of Advanced Study, Shimla. She was a faculty member at Jawaharlal Nehru University, and Founder Director (Hon.) of the Rang Datta Wadekar Centre for the study of Indian Tradition, Pune.

Theories
Shendge has written a number of books on the connections between the Indus Valley civilization and Vedic culture. Her early work, The Civilized Demons, reinterprets the heavenly battle between the Asuras and the Devas described in the Rigveda as a historical record of an earthly war in the Indus Valley between the Asuras (identified by her as being the Assyrian people) already living in the valley as the Harappan Civilization, and the invading Devas (identified by her with the Aryans). Her 1997 book The Language of the Harappans extends this theory by claiming that the unknown Harappan language was the Akkadian language of Mesopotamia, and that Sanskrit is a descendant of Akkadian. In Unsealing the Indus Script (2009) she purports to decode the Indus script based on this theory.

Books
 (1977) The Civilized Demons: the Harappans in Rig Veda
 (1989) Rigveda: The Original Meaning and its Recovery
 (1993) Indian Historiography and  History
 (1996) The Aryas: Facts Without Fancy and Fiction. Abhinav. 
 (1995) Songs and Ruins: Rigveda in Harappan Setting
 (1997) The Language of the Harappans: From Akkadian to Sanskrit. Abhinav. 
 (2004) Sat-Sashastrika Hevajratika
 (2009) Unsealing the Indus Script: Anatomy of its Decipherment
 (2009) Buddhahood in this Body: Japanese Esoteric Buddhism (Shin-gon) in Context

References

Indian Indologists
Marathi people
1934 births
Delhi University alumni
Scholars from Delhi
Indian women scholars
Women writers from Delhi
20th-century Indian linguists
20th-century Indian historians
Indian women science writers
Women educators from Delhi
Educators from Delhi
20th-century women writers
2015 deaths
Academic staff of Jawaharlal Nehru University
20th-century Indian women